The 1945 Peip'ing Curtiss C-46 Commando crash occurred on October 12, 1945, when a USAAF Curtiss C-46 Commando aircraft crashed near Nanyuan Airport in Peip'ing (now known as Beijing) while en route to there from Hankou (now part of Wuhan).  All 59 people on board perished.  It was the deadliest plane crash in 1945 and, at the time it occurred, the deadliest one on the soil of the Republic of China. The crash also is the worst ever involving the C-46.

On the day of the accident, the aircraft, carrying 55 Chinese soldiers and a crew of four, neared Peip'ing in unfavorable overcast weather conditions.  In addition, Nanyuan Airport was lacking in radio beacons, forcing the crew to rely on a commercial broadcasting station to navigate.  On approach, the C-46 struck the station's radio antenna and crashed, killing all aboard.

References

1945 in China
Aviation accidents and incidents in 1945
Aviation accidents and incidents in China
Accidents and incidents involving military aircraft
Accidents and incidents involving the Curtiss-Wright C-46 Commando
October 1945 events in Asia